Kurisumala Ashram is a Trappist monastery of the Syro-Malankara Catholic Church in the Sahya Mountains in Vagamon, Kerala, India.

History 

Francis Mahieu, a Trappist monk from the Scourmont Abbey in Belgium came to Kerala to start the ashram in 1956. The invitation came from Zacharias Mar Athanasios, then the Bishop of Thiruvalla. Eventually, he was joined by Bede Griffiths. On 1st December 1956, Mahieu and Griffiths laid the foundation at Tiruvalla in the Syro-Malankara Catholic Church . They obtained  of land and on 20 March 1958, they travelled sixty miles to a mountain known as Kurisumala. The monastery was officially established 21 March 1958. They soon started a dairy farm with cattle imported from Jersey to support themselves .

Within three years, the population of the monastery grew to fifteen individuals. Prayer services were initially held in Syriac.

The monastery was incorporated as an abbey into the Cistercian Order of Strict Observance in July 1998.

After Acharya's death, Yesudas Thelliyil was blessed as the monastery's second abbot in March 2002.

Bede Griffiths spent the last years of his life at Shantivanam in Tamil Nadu . Francis Acharya became the only religious leader of the Ashram at Kurisumala. A couple of years before his death in 2002, Acharya, who had kept in touch with the monastery of his youth, had the Kurisumala Ashram affiliated to the Trappists .

Name 
Kurisu is the translation of the word cross into Malayalam, the language of Kerala, while on the other hand Mala means mountain and ashram means monastery.

Practice 
In the monastery, the liturgical services are in the Syro-Malankara tradition and use the Indian Rite Mass. The mass includes chants, ceremonies, and symbols which are adapted from Hindu tradition.

The monks have a nightly satsang, a time of reflection which may include readings from Christian or HIndu texts. 

The monastery has hosted Hindu guests and religious figures.

Bibliography 
Francis Acharya: Cistercian Spirituality: An Ashram Perspective, Cistercian (Monastic wisdom series), 2011, 136pp.

References

External links 

 Official website
 Syro-Malankara Catholic Church

Syro-Malankara Catholic Church
Trappist monasteries
Eastern Catholic monasteries in India